Omoglymmius feae is a species of beetle in the subfamily Rhysodidae. It was described by Antoine Henri Grouvelle in 1895. It is known from the type series collected by Leonardo Fea in Myanmar in 1888.

References

feae
Beetles of Asia
Insects of Myanmar
Beetles described in 1895